Couzon-au-Mont-d'Or is a commune in the Metropolis of Lyon in the Auvergne-Rhône-Alpes region in eastern France.

References

Communes of Lyon Metropolis
Lyonnais